Virginia Ann Crosbie (born 8 December 1966) is a British Conservative Party politician who has been the Member of Parliament (MP) for Ynys Môn since the 2019 general election. Prior to her political career, she worked as a director at UBS and HSBC before retraining as a mathematics teacher.

Early life
Crosbie was born in Maldon, Essex, to an English mother and Welsh father, and grew up in the village of Tiptree, where her mother worked at the Tiptree Jam Factory. She attended Colchester County High School. As a teenager, she worked as a dolphin trainer at the Woburn Safari Park for Terry Nutkins's BBC children's television series Animal Magic. She studied microbiology at Queen Mary University of London before completing a diploma in management studies at the University of Westminster. After graduating, Crosbie worked for Glaxo Wellcome before becoming a pharmaceutical analyst at the bank UBS. She became a director at UBS and later at HSBC. She then retrained, and became a part-time mathematics teacher.

She is a former chair of the charity Save the Baby which is based at St Mary's Hospital, Paddington. Crosbie decided to join the organisation after experiencing a miscarriage. She was a director of Women2Win.

Parliamentary career
Crosbie contested the Rhondda constituency as the Conservative candidate in the 2017 general election. She finished third behind the Labour Party and Plaid Cymru candidates. She then became the deputy chair of the Kensington, Chelsea and Fulham Conservatives Association, and the director of Women2Win, an organisation which campaigns for more female Conservative parliamentarians. She also worked as a senior parliamentary researcher for Basingstoke MP Maria Miller.

She was selected as the Conservative candidate for Ynys Môn on 14 November 2019 (the day when nominations closed). Crosbie was chosen after the former Brecon and Radnorshire MP Chris Davies, the previously selected candidate, withdrew the day before due to opposition by the local association, and other Welsh Conservatives. The constituency had been represented by a Labour Party MP since the 2001 general election. She is the first Conservative MP to represent this three-way marginal seat since 1987.

In January 2020, Crosbie tabled an early day motion about the protection of the Welsh language. From February 2020 to August 2021, she was the Parliamentary Private Secretary (PPS) to the Department of Health and Social Care. Crosbie has been a member of the Welsh Affairs Select Committee since 2020 and sat on the Women and Equalities Committee between March and September 2020. In July 2020, Crosbie apologised for errors on her Welsh language website, stating that the machine translation was "not 100% perfect". She said she was learning the Welsh language and working on a fully bilingual website.

In January 2021, Crosbie began a campaign to get 100 people in Anglesey trained in mental health first aid. She runs a long term campaign to find Anglesey's Hidden Heroes which she launched in 2020 during the Covid pandemic. She has campaigned locally for improved broadband connectivity, and better availability of defibrillators.

In 2020, Crosbie started the Anglesey Freeport Bidding Consortium following the UK Government's announcement that at least one freeport would be established in Wales.  She sponsored Anglesey County Council's bids for the Community Renewal Fund and Levelling Up Fund. 

Since beginning her career as an MP, Crosbie has made the case for building new nuclear power stations in the UK. She is the co-chair with fellow Conservative MP Trudy Harrison of the Nuclear Delivery Group which was formed in December 2020. She has been vocal in her support of setting up a new nuclear plant on the site of Wylfa on Anglesey.

From September 2021 to July 2022, she was a Parliamentary Private Secretary in the Office of the Secretary of State for Wales. Crosbie resigned as PPS in July 2022 in protest against the leadership of Prime Minister Boris Johnson over his handling of the Chris Pincher scandal. She endorsed Sajid Javid in the July 2022 Conservative Party leadership election.

In January 2023, Crosbie said that she wears a stab vest when meeting constituents. She commented that she took this precaution following the murder of Conservative MP Sir David Amess in 2021. Crosbie had previously reported around 30 threats, abusive emails and social media posts to the police since being elected as an MP which included violent threats.

Personal life
Crosbie is married and has three children. Her brother Simon died of suicide in 2018 at the age of 52. 

After her election in December 2019, she committed to learning the Welsh language and passed her entry level speaking examination in July 2021.

References

External links

1966 births
Living people
Conservative Party (UK) MPs for Welsh constituencies
English people of Welsh descent
Female members of the Parliament of the United Kingdom for Welsh constituencies
UK MPs 2019–present
21st-century British women politicians
People educated at Colchester County High School
Alumni of Queen Mary University of London
Alumni of the University of Westminster
People from Maldon, Essex
HSBC people
UBS people